Bae Jeong-ho (date of birth unknown, died 16 January 1963) was a South Korean footballer. He competed in the men's tournament at the 1948 Summer Olympics.

References

External links
 

Year of birth missing
1963 deaths
South Korean footballers
South Korea international footballers
Olympic footballers of South Korea
Footballers at the 1948 Summer Olympics
Place of birth missing
Association football forwards